The 1962–63 Duke Blue Devils men's basketball team represented Duke University. The head coach was Vic Bubas. The team played its home games in the Cameron Indoor Stadium in Durham, North Carolina, and was a member of the Atlantic Coast Conference.

Roster

Compiled from multiple sources

Schedule and results

|-
!colspan=9 style=| Regular Season

|-
!colspan=9 style=| ACC Tournament

|-
!colspan=9 style=| NCAA Tournament

NCAA basketball tournament
West
Duke 81, New York 76
Duke 73, St. Joseph's, Pennsylvania 59
Final Four
Loyola–Chicago 94, Duke 75
Third-place game
Duke 85, Oregon State 63

Awards and honors
 Art Heyman, AP National Player of the Year award
 Art Heyman, ACC Player of the Year award
 Art Heyman, NCAA Men's MOP Award
 Art Heyman, USBWA College Player of the Year

Team players drafted into the NBA

References

External links
Roster and stats at Sports Reference

Duke
Duke Blue Devils men's basketball seasons
NCAA Division I men's basketball tournament Final Four seasons
Duke
1962 in sports in North Carolina
1963 in sports in North Carolina